Events from the year 1733 in Canada.

Incumbents
French Monarch: Louis XV
British and Irish Monarch: George II

Governors
Governor General of New France: Charles de la Boische, Marquis de Beauharnois
Colonial Governor of Louisiana: Étienne Perier
Governor of Nova Scotia: Lawrence Armstrong
Commodore-Governor of Newfoundland: Edward Falkingham

Events
 Vitus Bering's second expedition, with George Wilhelm Steller aboard, the first naturalist to visit Alaska.

Births
 Marie-Josephte Corriveau, criminal (died 1763)
 François Baby, politician and businessman

Deaths

Historical documents
Hudson's Bay Company chief factor roams to expand trade, "to the Hazard of my Life," doubling number of skins from "Northern Indians"

HBC will sell for 1 beaver skin: 12 needles, 12 buttons, 6 thimbles, 2 scrapers, 1 lb. thread, or 3/4 lb. coloured beads

HBC mason rises above others' incompetence at Churchill River construction site, and sketches winter fishing, hunting and timber work

Extensive summary of century of English and French claims to Acadia supports French descendant's right to her property in Nova Scotia

French threat in Nova Scotia shows need for Palatines, Newfoundland "straglers," and soldiers with wives to help "peopling the countrey"

Lt. Gov. Armstrong orders troops to Minas and boat from Boston to prevent remote Nova Scotia becoming "more independent of the English"

Armstrong plans to employ surveyor "to make out a plan of the woods and lands in the Bay of Fundy" and elsewhere in Nova Scotia

Receiving ordnance at Annapolis, Armstrong calls for some at Canso, and also effort to undercut traders' prices to please Indigenous people

"Cope[...]Agreed to the Justness of their Demand" - Nova Scotia Council decides in favour of workers' wage demand from colliery management

Lt. Gov. Armstrong orders Nova Scotia Council members to address chair at their meetings, and not "Reproach and Reprimand one another"

"Redress" - New York governor Cosby rectifies fraud Corporation of Albany used to cheat Kanien’kéhà:ka of 1,000 acres of their land

Cosby explains how expanding settlement of northern New York requires "forts in places more advanced towards Canada"

Cosby recounts answering request from Île-Royale for emergency food supplies and comments on precarious condition of Louisbourg

In Newfoundland, "the New England traders do still continue to carry away numbers of fishermen and seamen"

"Generally trusted on the credit of their masters,[...]many [fishers run debts too high to pay and] endeavour to get to New England"

£500 sterling is penalty for any "ships belonging and bound to New England[...]to carry any men more than their ship's company"

There is winter "furring trade" in Trinity Bay and north of Cape Bonavista, "but I don't learn that they have any traffick with the Indians"

Contract between missionary priest and blacksmith who will work in the Wendat (Huron) village at Detroit (Note: "savages" used)

References

 
33